Francine Niyonizigiye (born 26 September 1988) is a Burundian athlete who specializes in the long-distance running.

She competed at the 2008 Summer Olympics in Beijing, in the 5000 metres, where she placed fourteenth in the heats at a time of 17:08.44. Niyonizigiye was also the flag bearer at the opening ceremony.

References

External links 

NBC profile

1988 births
Living people
Burundian female long-distance runners
Athletes (track and field) at the 2004 Summer Olympics
Athletes (track and field) at the 2008 Summer Olympics
Olympic athletes of Burundi
20th-century Burundian people
21st-century Burundian people